Farooq Hamid (born 3 March 1945) is a former Pakistani cricketer who played in one Test in 1964.

Career
A tall right-arm opening bowler, Farooq Hamid made his first-class debut in 1961-62, and toured England with the Pakistan Eaglets in 1963. He played two matches for Pakistan against the Commonwealth XI in 1963-64, when Alf Gover judged that he was one of the fastest bowlers in the world, but lacked accuracy. 

Hamid toured Australia and New Zealand with the Pakistan team in 1964-65, playing his only Test against Australia in Melbourne. His only Test wicket was that of Ian Chappell, who was also playing his first Test match. He continued playing first-class cricket in Pakistan until the 1969-70 season, when he retired owing to having received no encouragement or opportunity to play for his country.

His best first-class bowling figures came in the match against Wellington in 1964-65, when he bowled unchanged through the innings to take 7 for 16 and dismiss Wellington for 53. Playing for PIA against Peshawar in 1967-68 he took 5 for 30 and 5 for 20.

Hamid's cousin Khalid Aziz also played first-class cricket in Pakistan and was a Test umpire. Farooq's sister Tahira Hamid helped to set up the Pakistan Women's Cricket Association in 1978. She was the inaugural secretary.

References

External links
 Farooq Hameed at Cricket Archive
 Farooq Hamid at Cricinfo

1945 births
Living people
Farooq Hamid
Pakistani cricketers
Pakistan Eaglets cricketers
Lahore A cricketers
Pakistan International Airlines cricketers
Central Zone (Pakistan) cricketers
Pakistan International Airlines B cricketers
Lahore cricketers
Lahore Greens cricketers
Cricketers from Lahore